Eurovision: You Decide was the most recent name of the BBC TV show broadcast to select the United Kingdom's entry into the Eurovision Song Contest.

Shows of similar formats have previously gone under several other names, including Festival of British Popular Songs, Eurovision Song Contest British Final, A Song For Europe, The Great British Song Contest, Eurovision: Making Your Mind Up and Eurovision: Your Decision. In 2011 the selection process was replaced by an internal BBC decision, but this process ended after 2015 with a revival of a national final for 2016 under a new name. The You Decide format was axed in September 2019 and an internal selection was used for the UK's 2020 participation.

This page lists the contestants for each year of the show; the winners of the contest are in bold-italics.

Competition
In 1957, 1959 and 1960, there were a series of televised heats prior to the final.

Postcard voting was used to choose the winner from 1965 to 1975. This had to be abandoned in 1971 due to a postal strike, with regional juries, made up of ordinary members of the public selecting the winner. Juries did the job from 1957 to 1964 and from 1976 to 1987. From 1988 onwards, with the exception of the internally selected entries (2011–15 and 2020–21), televoting has been organized ostensibly to choose the winner, although this result wasn't always followed. Panels of judges have also played a part in selecting finalists and the winners in various years since 2008.

Festival of British Popular Songs (1957)
1957
Tuesday, 12 February. The King's Theatre Hammersmith, London.
Host: David Jacobs
Each song was performed by two different artists
Voting: 10 regional juries of 12 members with 1 vote each, located in Belfast, Newcastle, Bangor, Edinburgh, Manchester, Nottingham, Cardiff, Birmingham, Glasgow & London.

~ Eliminated in one of three televised heats (Tuesday, 22 January, Tuesday, 29 January & Tuesday, 5 February).

1958 Not Held. No UK Entry at Eurovision Song Contest

Eurovision Song Contest British Final (1959–1960)

1959
Saturday, 7 February. BBC Television Theatre, London.
Host: Pete Murray
Voting: 7 regional juries from South of England, English Midlands, Northern England, Northern Ireland, Scotland, Wales & West of England, with 14 persons in each jury.

~ Eliminated in one of two televised heats (Monday, 2 February & Thursday, 5 February).

1960
Saturday, 6 February. BBC Television Theatre, London.
Host: David Jacobs
Voting:  7 Regional Juries, with 15 people in each jury. Juries: South of England, English Midlands, North of England, Scotland, Wales, West of England and Northern Ireland.

~ Eliminated in one of two televised heats (Tuesday, 2 February & Thursday, 4 February).

A Song For Europe (1961–1995)

1961
Wednesday, 15 February. BBC Television Theatre, London.
Hostess: Katie Boyle
Voting: 12 Regional Juries of 10 jurors with 1 vote each, located in Aberdeen, Glasgow, Belfast, Leeds, Bangor, Manchester, Norwich, Birmingham, Cardiff, London, Bristol & Southampton.

1962
Sunday, 11 February. BBC Television Theatre, London.
Host: David Jacobs
Voting: 14 Regional Juries in Aberdeen, Edinburgh, Glasgow, Belfast, Newcastle, Leeds, Manchester, Nottingham, Birmingham, Cardiff, London, Plymouth, Southampton and Bristol.

1963
Saturday, 23 February. BBC Television Theatre, London.
Host: David Jacobs
Voting: 16 Regional Juries in Aberdeen, Edinburgh, Glasgow, Belfast, Newcastle, Leeds, Manchester, Nottingham, Norwich, Birmingham, Cardiff, London North, London South, Plymouth, Southampton & Bristol. 12 persons in each jury, awarding 3 points to their favourite, 2 points to the second and 1 point to the third.

1964
Friday, 7 February. BBC Television Theatre, London.
Host: David Jacobs
All Songs Performed by Matt Monro
Voting: 16 Regional Juries.

1965
Friday, 29 January. BBC Television Theatre, London.
Host: David Jacobs
All Songs Performed by Kathy Kirby on "The Kathy Kirby Show"
Result broadcast Friday, 12 February.
Voting: Viewers cast votes via postcard for their favourite song.

1966
Thursday, 27 January. BBC Television Theatre, London.
Host: David Jacobs
All Songs Performed by Kenneth McKellar on "Kenneth McKellar's Song For Everyone" (BBC1) and "The Light Programme" (BBC Radio)
Result broadcast Thursday, 3 February.
Voting: Viewers cast votes via postcard for their favourite song.

1967
Saturday, 25 February. BBC Television Theatre, London.
Host: Rolf Harris
All Songs Performed by Sandie Shaw on "The Rolf Harris Show"
Result broadcast Saturday, 4 March.
Voting: Viewers cast votes via postcard for their favourite song.

1968
Tuesday, 5 March. BBC Television Theatre, London.
Hostess: Cilla Black
All Songs Performed by Cliff Richard on "Cilla"
Result broadcast Tuesday, 12 March.
Voting: Viewers cast votes via postcard for their favourite song. Results announced by Tom Sloan.

1969
Saturday, 22 February. BBC Television Theatre, London.
Host: Michael Aspel
All Songs Performed by Lulu on "Lulu"
Result broadcast Saturday, 1 March.
Voting: Viewers cast votes via postcard for their favourite song. Results announced by Tom Sloan.

1970
Saturday, 7 March. BBC Television Theatre, London.
Host: Cliff Richard
All Songs Performed by Mary Hopkin on "It's Cliff Richard!"
Result broadcast Saturday, 14 March.
Voting: Viewers cast votes via postcard for their favourite song. Results announced by Bill Cotton.

1971
Saturday, 20 February. BBC Television Theatre, London.
Host: Cliff Richard
All Songs Performed by Clodagh Rodgers on "It's Cliff Richard!" (BBC1) and "The Acker Bilk Show" (BBC Radio 2)
Result broadcast Saturday, 27 February.
Voting: 8 Regional Juries in Belfast, Birmingham, Bristol, Cardiff, Glasgow, London, Manchester & Norwich, each with 10 jurors who could award 1 vote to their favourite song. Results announced by Bill Cotton.

1972
Saturday, 12 February. BBC Television Theatre, London.
Host: Cliff Richard
All Songs Performed by The New Seekers on "It's Cliff Richard!" (BBC1) and "Pete Murray's Open House" (BBC Radio 2)
Result broadcast Saturday, 19 February.
Voting: Viewers cast votes via postcard for their favourite song. Results announced by Bill Cotton.

1973
Saturday, 24 February. BBC Television Theatre, London.
Hostess: Cilla Black
All Songs Performed by Cliff Richard on "Cilla" (BBC1) and "Pete Murray's Open House" (BBC Radio 2)
Result broadcast Saturday, 3 March.
Voting: Viewers cast votes via postcard for their favourite song. Results announced by Bill Cotton.

1974
Saturday, 23 February. BBC Television Theatre, London.
Host: Jimmy Savile
All Songs Performed by Olivia Newton-John on "Clunk, Click... As It Happens" (BBC1) and "Pete Murray's Open House" (BBC Radio 2)
Result broadcast Saturday, 2 March.
Voting: Viewers cast votes via postcard for their favourite song. Results announced by Bill Cotton.

1975
Saturday, 15 February. BBC Television Theatre, London.
Hostess: Lulu
All Songs Performed by The Shadows on "Lulu" (BBC1) and "Pete Murray's Open House" (BBC Radio 2)
Result broadcast Saturday, 22 February.
Voting: Viewers cast votes via postcard for their favourite song. Results announced by Bill Cotton.

1976
Wednesday, 25 February. The Royal Albert Hall, London.
Host: Michael Aspel
Voting: 14 Regional Juries located in Bristol, Bangor, Leeds, Norwich, Newcastle, Aberdeen, Birmingham, Manchester, Belfast, Cardiff, Plymouth, Glasgow, Southampton and London. Each jury ranked the songs 1-12, awarding 12 points for their favourite down to 1 point for their least preferred. Trophies presented by Jimmy Gilbert.

Although all the regional scores were announced in turn by a spokesman (there were no female announcers), and many were recognisable to viewers; none of the voices were identified either by the spokesman or host Michael Aspel. 

1977
Wednesday, 9 March. The New London Theatre, London.
Host: Terry Wogan
Voting: 14 Regional Juries located in Belfast, Bristol, Aberdeen, Bangor, Leeds, London, Birmingham, Cardiff, Glasgow, Norwich, Newcastle, Manchester, Plymouth and Southampton. Each jury ranked the songs 1-12, awarding 12 points for their favourite down to 1 point for their least preferred.
(Show not televised due to strike action)

1978
Friday, 31 March. The Royal Albert Hall, London.
Host: Terry Wogan
Voting: 14 Regional Juries located in Belfast, Bristol, Aberdeen, Bangor, Leeds, London, Birmingham, Cardiff, Glasgow, Norwich, Newcastle, Manchester, Plymouth and Southampton. Each jury ranked the songs 1-12, awarding 12 points for their favourite down to 1 point for their least preferred. Trophies presented by Jimmy Gilbert.

Voting Spokespersons

1979
Thursday, 8 March. The Royal Albert Hall, London.
Host: Terry Wogan
Voting: 14 Regional Juries located in Belfast, Bristol, Aberdeen, Bangor, Leeds, London, Birmingham, Cardiff, Glasgow, Norwich, Newcastle, Manchester, Plymouth and Southampton. Each jury ranked the songs 1-12, awarding 12 points for their favourite down to 1 point for their least preferred based on audio recordings of the songs. At the time, Manchester's votes were not included in the final tally as the jury could not be contacted and songs 6 & 12 were declared joint 2nd. The scores and places were adjusted later once the Manchester scores had been confirmed.
(Show abandoned due to strike action)

1980
Wednesday, 26 March. BBC Television Theatre, London.
Host: Terry Wogan
Voting: 14 Regional Juries located in Belfast, Bristol, Aberdeen, Bangor, Leeds, London, Birmingham, Cardiff, Glasgow, Norwich, Newcastle, Manchester, Plymouth and Southampton. Each jury ranked the songs 1-12, awarding 12 points for their favourite down to 1 point for their least preferred. Each jury then awarded 1 vote for the top two songs to break a tie. Trophies presented by Jimmy Gilbert.

Voting Spokespersons

1981
Wednesday, 11 March. BBC Television Theatre, London.
Host: Terry Wogan
Voting: 7 Regional Juries located in Birmingham, Cardiff, Manchester, Belfast, Edinburgh, London and Bristol. Juries ranked the songs internally and awarded 15 points to their favourite, 12 to the second, 10 to the third, 9 to the fourth, 8 to the fifth, 7 to the sixth, 6 to the seventh and 5 to their least preferred.

Voting Spokespersons

1982
Wednesday, 24 March. BBC Television Centre, London.
Host: Terry Wogan
Voting: 7 Regional Juries located in Glasgow, Birmingham, Bristol, Manchester, Belfast, London, Manchester and Cardiff. Juries ranked the songs internally and awarded 15 points to their favourite, 12 to the second, 10 to the third, 9 to the fourth, 8 to the fifth, 7 to the sixth, 6 to the seventh and 5 to their least preferred.

Voting Spokespersons

1983
Thursday, 24 March. BBC Television Theatre, London.
Host: Terry Wogan
Voting: 8 Regional Juries located in Birmingham, Cardiff, Manchester, Belfast, Edinburgh, London, Norwich and Bristol. Juries ranked the songs internally and awarded 15 points to their favourite, 12 to the second, 10 to the third, 9 to the fourth, 8 to the fifth, 7 to the sixth, 6 to the seventh and 5 to their least preferred.

Voting Spokespersons

1984
Wednesday, 4 April. BBC Television Centre, London.
Host: Terry Wogan
Voting: 8 Regional Juries located in Edinburgh, Norwich, Belfast, London, Cardiff, Manchester, Bristol and Birmingham. Juries ranked the songs internally and awarded 15 points to their favourite, 12 to the second, 10 to the third, 9 to the fourth, 8 to the fifth, 7 to the sixth, 6 to the seventh and 5 to their least preferred.

Voting Spokespersons

1985
Friday, 5 April. BBC Television Centre, London.
Host: Terry Wogan
Voting: 9 Regional Juries located in Belfast, Birmingham, Cardiff, Glasgow, London, Norwich, Bristol, Manchester and Plymouth. Juries ranked the songs internally and awarded 15 points to their favourite, 12 to the second, 10 to the third, 9 to the fourth, 8 to the fifth, 7 to the sixth, 6 to the seventh and 5 to their least preferred.

Voting Spokespersons

1986
Wednesday, 2 April. BBC Television Centre, London.
Host: Terry Wogan
Voting: 11 Regional Juries located in Birmingham, Manchester, Bristol, Norwich, Newcastle, Cardiff, London, Leeds, Glasgow, Plymouth & Belast. Juries ranked the songs internally and awarded 15 points to their favourite, 12 to the second, 10 to the third, 9 to the fourth, 8 to the fifth, 7 to the sixth, 6 to the seventh and 5 to their least preferred. The final scores accord with the announced scores during the broadcast, whereas the scoreboard used in the telecast was incorrect due to a technical issue.

Voting Spokespersons

1987
Friday, 10 April. BBC Television Centre, London.
Host: Terry Wogan
Voting: 9 Regional Juries located in Belfast, Birmingham, Bristol, Edinburgh, Cardiff, Manchester, London, Newcastle and Norwich. Juries ranked the songs internally and awarded 15 points to their favourite, 12 to the second, 10 to the third, 9 to the fourth, 8 to the fifth, 7 to the sixth, 6 to the seventh, 5 to the eighth, 3 to the ninth and 1 to their least preferred.

Voting Spokespersons

1988
Friday, 25 March. BBC Television Centre, London.
Host: Terry Wogan
With guest commentators: Gloria Hunniford, Bruce Welch, Mike Batt & George Martin
Voting: Viewers voted by telephone for their favourite song. Scores announced by Gordon Robson.

1989
Friday, 24 March. BBC Television Centre, London.
Host: Terry Wogan
With guest commentators: Lulu, Deke Arlon, Leslie Bricusse & Gary Davies
Voting: Viewers voted by telephone for their favourite song. Scores announced by Gordon Robson.

1990
Friday, 30 March. BBC Television Centre, London.
Host: Terry Wogan
With guest commentators: Gloria Hunniford, Cathy McGowan, Tim Rice & Carl Davis
Voting: Viewers voted by telephone for their favourite song. Scores announced by Gordon Robson.

1991
Friday, 29 March. BBC Television Centre, London.
Host: Terry Wogan
Voting: Viewers voted by telephone for their favourite song. Scores announced by Gordon Robson.

1992
Friday, 3 April. BBC Television Centre, London.
Host: Terry Wogan
All Songs Performed by Michael Ball
Voting: Viewers voted by telephone for their favourite song. Scores announced by Gordon Robson.

1993
Friday, 9 April. BBC Television Centre, London.
Host: Terry Wogan
All Songs Performed by Sonia
Voting: Viewers voted by telephone for their favourite song. Scores announced by Gordon Robson.

1994
Friday, 18 March. BBC Television Centre, London.
Host: Terry Wogan
With guest commentators: Richard O'Brien & Jonathan King
All Songs Performed by Frances Ruffelle
Voting: Viewers voted by telephone for their favourite song. Scores announced by Mike Anderries.

1995
Friday, 31 March. BBC Television Centre, London.
Host: Terry Wogan with Mark Goodier presenting a Top of the Pops preview show
With guest commentators: Tony Mortimer, Ian Dury, Cheryl Baker, Mike Read, Let Loose, Jonathan King, Scarlet & Bruno Brookes
Voting: Viewers voted by telephone for their favourite song. Scores announced by Mike Anderries.

The Great British Song Contest (1996–1999)

1996
Friday, 8 March. BBC Television Centre, London.
Host: Terry Wogan
Voting: Viewers voted by telephone for their favourite song.

~ Eliminated in a televised heat hosted by Nicky Campbell.

1997
Sunday, 9 March. BBC Television Centre, London.
Host: Dale Winton
Result broadcast Saturday, 15 March.
Voting: Viewers voted by telephone for their favourite song.

* Eliminated in a radio only heat hosted by Terry Wogan & Ken Bruce.

1998
Sunday, 15 March. BBC Television Centre, London.
Host: Terry Wogan
Result broadcast Saturday, 21 March.
Voting: Viewers voted by telephone for their favourite song.

* Eliminated in a radio only heat hosted by Terry Wogan & Ken Bruce.

1999
Sunday, 7 March. BBC Elstree Studios, Borehamwood.
Hostess: Ulrika Jonsson
Result broadcast Friday, 12 March.
Voting: Viewers voted by telephone for their favourite song.

* Eliminated in a radio only heat hosted by Terry Wogan & Ken Bruce.

A Song For Europe (2000–2003)
2000
Sunday, 20 February. BBC Elstree Studios, Borehamwood.
Hostess: Katy Hill
Voting: Viewers voted by telephone for their favourite song.

* Eliminated in a radio only heat hosted by Terry Wogan & Ken Bruce.

2001
Sunday, 11 March. BBC Elstree Studios, Borehamwood.
Hostess: Katy Hill
Voting: Viewers voted by telephone for their favourite song.

* Eliminated in a radio only heat hosted by Terry Wogan & Ken Bruce.

2002
Sunday, 3 March. BBC Elstree Studios, Borehamwood.
Hosts: Christopher Price & Claire Sweeney
Voting: Viewers voted by telephone for their favourite song.

* Eliminated in a radio only heat hosted by Terry Wogan & Ken Bruce.

2003
Sunday, 2 March. BBC Television Centre, London.
Host: Terry Wogan
Voting: Viewers voted by telephone for their favourite song. The votes were then divided into 6 regions: Scotland, Southern England, Northern Ireland, English Midlands, Northern England and Wales, with 12 points given to the highest scoring song in each region, 10 to the second, 9 to the third and 0 to the fourth placed song.

* Eliminated in a radio only heat hosted by Terry Wogan & Ken Bruce.
"Now And Forever" was performed in the radio only semi final by Esther Hart and was titled "Wait for the Moment". Hart withdrew when she qualified for the Dutch National Final. Her replacement was the group 'United Colours of Sound', who also withdrew before the televised final; being replaced in turn by Simon Chapman.

Voting Spokespersons

Eurovision: Making Your Mind Up! (2004–2007)

2004
Saturday, 28 February. BBC Television Centre, London.
Hosts: Terry Wogan & Gaby Roslin with Paddy O'Connell on BBC Three
With Panellists: Carrie Grant, Harry Hill & Lorraine Kelly
Voting: Viewers voted by telephone for their favourite song. The votes were then divided into 7 regions: South West England, Wales, Northern Ireland, English Midlands, South East England, Northern England and Scotland, with 12 points given to the highest scoring song in each region, 8 to the second, 6 to the third, 4 to the fourth, 2 to the fifth and 0 to the lowest ranked song. Votes given by SMS (regardless of location) were separately allocated as a percentage of the vote received and added to the regional scores.

Voting spokespersons

2005
Saturday, 5 March. BBC Television Centre, London.
Hosts: Terry Wogan & Natasha Kaplinsky
With Panellists: Jonathan Ross, Bruno Tonioli, Paddy O'Connell & Natalie Cassidy
Voting: Viewers voted by telephone for their favourite song. The votes were then divided into 8 regions: South West England, South East England, Wales, Northern Ireland, English Midlands, Northern England, Scotland and any votes cast via the Internet (regardless of location), with 12 points given to the highest scoring song in each region, 8 to the second, 6 to the third, 4 to the fourth and 2 to the lowest ranked song. Votes given by SMS were separately allocated as a percentage of the vote received and added to the regional scores. Trophies presented by Sandie Shaw.

Voting spokespersons

2006
Saturday, 4 March. BBC Television Centre, London.
Hosts: Terry Wogan & Natasha Kaplinsky
With Panellists: Jonathan Ross, Bruno Tonioli, Fearne Cotton & Kelly Osbourne 
Voting: Viewers voted by telephone for their favourite song. The votes were then divided into 8 regions: Northern England, South East England, Scotland, English Midlands, Northern Ireland, Wales, South West England and any votes cast via the Internet (regardless of location), with 12 points given to the highest scoring song in each region, 8 to the second, 6 to the third, 4 to the fourth, 2 to the fifth and 0 to the lowest ranked song. Votes given by SMS were separately allocated as a percentage of the vote received and added to the regional scores. Trophies presented by Elena Paparizou.

Voting spokespersons

2007
Saturday, 17 March. Maidstone Studios, Maidstone, Kent.
Hosts: Terry Wogan & Fearne Cotton
With Panellists: John Barrowman & Mel Giedroyc
Voting: Viewers voted by phone for their favourite song. Following an initial round of voting, the top two songs were performed again and voted on a second time. No details of the scores were given.

Eurovision: Your Decision (2008)
2008
Saturday, 1 March. BBC Television Centre, London.
Hosts: Terry Wogan & Claudia Winkleman
With Panellists/Judges: John Barrowman & Carrie Grant
Voting: LoveShy, Rob McVeigh and Andy Abraham were eliminated by judges John Barrowman & Carrie Grant. Andy Abraham was then 'saved' by Terry Wogan and reinstated. Viewers voted by phone for their favourite of the four remaining songs. Following an initial round of voting, the top two songs were performed again and voted on a second time. No details of the scores were given.

Eurovision: Your Country Needs You (2009–2010)
2009
Saturday, 31 January. BBC Television Centre, London.
Host: Graham Norton
With Panellists: Andrew Lloyd Webber, Lulu, Diane Warren, Duncan James, Arlene Phillips, Emma Bunton & Alesha Dixon
Voting: Viewers voted by telephone for their favourite act each week. The bottom 2 acts were then judged by Andrew Lloyd Webber who chose to 'save' one of the 2. On the final show, viewers voted by telephone for their favourite of the three remaining acts. No details of the scoring was given.

Colour key
 Act received the most public votes
 Act was in the "danger zone"
 Act was eliminated by Andrew Lloyd Webber

2010
Friday, 12 March. BBC Television Centre, London.
Host: Graham Norton
With Judge: Pete Waterman and Panellists: Bruno Tonioli, Jade Ewen & Mike Stock
Voting: Three singing acts - Miss Fitz, Uni5 and Karen Harding - were eliminated by judge Pete Waterman. Viewers voted by telephone for their favourite of the three remaining acts. No details of the scoring was given.

Internal selections (2011–2015)
There was no televised national selection procedure for the UK Eurovision entrant from 2011 to 2015.

2011
Blue were selected to represent Britain in the Eurovision Song Contest 2011 internally by the BBC, with the song "I Can", written by Duncan James, Lee Ryan, Ciaron Bell, Ben Collier, Ian Hope, Liam Keenan and 'StarSign'. In place of a national final, a one-hour documentary following the groups preparations for Germany, entitled Eurovision: Your Country Needs Blue was broadcast by BBC One on 16 April 2011.

2012
Engelbert Humperdinck was selected internally by the BBC to perform "Love Will Set You Free". The song was written by Grammy award-winning producer Martin Terefe and Ivor Novello winner Sacha Skarbek, who co-wrote the James Blunt hit "You're Beautiful".

2013
An internal selection followed again in 2013, with Bonnie Tyler being chosen to represent the UK with the song "Believe in Me", written and composed by Desmond Child, Lauren Christy and Chris Braide.

2014
Another internal selection followed in 2014, with Molly being chosen to represent the UK with the song "Children of the Universe", co-written by herself and Swedish producer Anders Hansson. However, Smitten-Downes was a relatively unknown artist who was discovered through the BBC Introducing platform.

2015
A fifth internal selection took place in 2015, although the BBC accepted submissions from the public and song writing community. Electro Velvet were chosen to represent the UK with the song "Still in Love With You", co-written by Adrian Bax White and David Mindel, who had written many previous songs for the UK heats, his best result being two joint 2nd songs in 1982.

Eurovision: You Decide (2016–2019)
2016
Friday, 26 February. The O2 Forum, Kentish Town, London.
Hostess: Mel Giedroyc
With Panellists: Carrie Grant, Katrina Leskanich & Jay Revell
Voting: Viewers voted by telephone and/or online for their favourite song. No details of the scores or places were given.

2017
Friday, 27 January. Eventim Apollo, Hammersmith, London.
Hostess: Mel Giedroyc
With Panellists: Bruno Tonioli, Sophie Ellis-Bextor & CeCe Sammy
Voting: Viewers voted by telephone and/or online for their favourite song. The panel of experts, which formed part of the eight-member jury panel, also voted during the show. No details of the scores or places were given.

2018
Wednesday, 7 February. Brighton Dome, Brighton.
Hosts: Mel Giedroyc & Måns Zelmerlöw
With Panellists: Rylan, Rochelle Humes & Tom Fletcher
Voting: Viewers voted by telephone and/or online for their favourite song, combined with the votes from the eight-member jury, to select the winner. The panel of experts did not vote this year and no details of the scores or places were given.

2019
Friday, 8 February. Dock10, MediaCityUK, Salford, Greater Manchester.
Hosts: Mel Giedroyc & Måns Zelmerlöw
With Panellists: Rylan, Marvin Humes & Mollie King
Voting: Three songs competed in three "song-offs", where each song was performed in two musically different styles by two different artists, with one artist from each pair (chosen by the expert panel) going through to a final public vote. Following this, viewers then voted by telephone and/or online for their favourite song to select the winner. No details of the scores or places were given.

Internal selection (2020–present)
There was no televised national selection procedure for the UK Eurovision entry.

2020
On 27 February 2020, BBC announced that James Newman would represent the United Kingdom in the Eurovision Song Contest 2020 with the song, "My Last Breath". The Eurovision Song Contest 2020 was eventually cancelled.

2021
On 19 February 2021, BBC confirmed that Newman would represent the United Kingdom in the 2021 contest with the song "Embers". The BBC also announced the renewed collaboration between BBC Studios and record label BMG in finding the song. The song was released and published by BMG after being revealed in March 2021.

2022
On 10 March 2022, BBC revealed that Sam Ryder would represent the UK at the Eurovision Song Contest 2022 in Turin, Italy, with the song "Space Man".

2023
Mae Muller was announced as the chosen entrant with her song "I Wrote a Song" on 9 March 2023.

List of multiple contestants
Excludes internally selected entrants with no multi-artist national selection participations, uncredited backing singers and musicians, but includes members of groups named as such.

See also 
UK national selection for the Eurovision Song Contest
UK Eurovision Song Contest entries discography

Notes and references

Notes

References

United Kingdom in the Eurovision Song Contest